Susan Whetnall (born 11 December 1942 in Swanley, née Susan Pound) is a former English badminton player, noted for her anticipation and shot-making ability, who won numerous international titles in doubles and mixed doubles from the mid-1960s through the mid-1970s. She was married to another English former international player, Paul Whetnall, from 1968 until his death in May 2014.

Badminton career

All England
Whetnall shared three women's doubles titles (1969, 1970, 1976) and two mixed doubles titles (1968, 1974) at the All-England Championships which was then considered the world's most prestigious tournament for individual players.

Commonwealth Games
She represented England and won a gold medal and bronze medal, at the 1970 British Commonwealth Games in Edinburgh, Scotland. Four years later she won two more medals at the 1974 British Commonwealth Games in Christchurch, New Zealand.

European Championships
Whetnall won five gold medals, two silver medals and a bronze medal in the European Badminton Championships between 1968 and 1976, making her one of the most successful players ever in this biennial tournament.  She was elected to the Badminton Hall of Fame in 2009.

Major achievements (partial list)

References

All England champions 1899-2007
Statistics at badmintonengland.co.uk
European results
Pat Davis: The Encyclopaedia of Badminton. Robert Hale, London, 1987, p. 180, 

English female badminton players
People from Swanley
Badminton players at the 1970 British Commonwealth Games
Badminton players at the 1974 British Commonwealth Games
Commonwealth Games gold medallists for England
Commonwealth Games silver medallists for England
Commonwealth Games bronze medallists for England
Living people
1942 births
Commonwealth Games medallists in badminton
Medallists at the 1970 British Commonwealth Games
Medallists at the 1974 British Commonwealth Games